The Anglican Journal is the national newspaper of the Anglican Church of Canada.  Editorially independent, the Journal publishes news, features and opinion related to Anglicanism and religion in Canada and abroad.  It also contains an extensive arts and culture section, and classified advertising.  Its editor until July 2018 was Marites N. Sison. The headquarters is in Toronto.

The paper was first published under the name Dominion Churchman in 1875; and later as the Canadian Churchman.  It is published ten times a year, and is mailed separately or with one of 19 diocesan or regional publications. It is a member of the Canadian Church Press and Associated Church Press.

The Journal has been frequently cited for excellence in journalism, winning 33 awards, including first prize for general excellence, in 2016.

References

 "Anglican Journal wins 16 Canadian church press awards, May 2, 2016 
 "Anglican Journal wins 17 awards from Associated Church Press, April 25, 2016 
 "Journal Wins 17 Awards," Anglican Journal, June 1, 2008
 Masthead of the Anglican Journal
 Anglican Journal wins 12 awards from Associated Church Press, May 1, 2017 
 Anglican Journal wins 13 awards from Canadian Church Press awards, June 30, 2017

External links
 

Anglican Church of Canada
Newspapers established in 1875
National newspapers published in Canada
Anglican newspapers and magazines
1875 establishments in Ontario
Newspapers published in Toronto